Horton-by-Malpas is a former civil parish, now in the parish of Shocklach Oviatt and District, in the Borough of Cheshire West and Chester and ceremonial county of Cheshire in England. In 2001 it had a population of 62. The parish included the hamlet of Horton Green. The civil parish was abolished in 2015 to form Shocklach Oviatt and District.

History
The name Horton  derives from Old English horu 'dirt' and tūn 'settlement, farm, estate', presumably meaning 'farm on muddy soil'.

Horton Grange was built in 1629 and subsequently altered. It is timber-framed with brick nogging, and partly rebuilt in brick, with slate roofs.  It is in two storeys, and consists of a main wing and two cross-wings. The building is Grade II listed.

Horton Green
The small hamlet of Horton Green lay within the parish. The hamlet is recorded as "Horton Green" in 1831, but had been known as "Horton" as early as 1240.

References

External links

Former civil parishes in Cheshire
Cheshire West and Chester